Yirrkala ori is an eel in the family Ophichthidae (worm/snake eels). It was described by John E. McCosker in 2011. It is a marine, subtropical eel which is known from South Africa, in the western Indian Ocean.

The species epithet "ori" consists of the initials of the Oceanographic Research Institute of South Africa, by which the key specimens of the species were collected.

References

Ophichthidae
Fish described in 2011